Bluemont is a suburban neighborhood in Arlington, Virginia. , the population is 7,049 people.

Demographics
, 72.6% of Bluemont's population is white, 9.9% is Hispanic, 8.5% is Asian, 6.5% is mixed race, 2.4% is black, and 0.1% is other. As of 2020, most children will go to Ashlawn Elementary School, Kenmore Middle School, and Washington-Liberty High School.

References

Populated places in Arlington County, Virginia